The Nur Al-Din Mosque (transliteration: Jami Nur al-Din) is a Zengid-era mosque in Hama, Syria. It was founded by Nur al-Din in 1163-64 CE. It also contained a historic minbar from the same date, which is now held at the local Hama Museum.

The mosque was profoundly damaged in the 1982 shelling of the city and subsequently restored to its current state.

References

Bibliography

Zengid mosques in Syria
Religious buildings and structures completed in 1172
Mosques in Hama
Architecture in Syria
12th-century mosques